Karolus Kaarlehto (born 1 September 1997) is a Finnish professional ice hockey goaltender. He is currently playing for Timrå IK in the Swedish Hockey League (SHL) on loan from Finnish club, Oulun Kärpät of the Liiga.

Playing career
Kaarlehto began his career in his native Turku, playing in junior teams for TUTO Hockey and TPS. He had two separate loan spells with TUTO of Mestis in 2016 and 2017. He then spent a month on loan at SaPKo on 2 January 2018 before being loaned to TUTO a third time on 1 February 2018.

On 3 May 2018, Kaarlehto joined SaiPa but was loaned out to Mestis once more, this time to Ketterä on 18 September 2018. Kaarlehto became a member of SaiPa's roster for the 2019–20 Liiga season and made his debut for the team on 14 September 2019 against KooKoo.

References

External links
 

1997 births
Living people
HK Dukla Michalovce players
Esbjerg Energy players
Finnish ice hockey goaltenders
Imatran Ketterä players
MHk 32 Liptovský Mikuláš players
Mikkelin Jukurit players
Oulun Kärpät players
SaiPa players
SaPKo players
Timrå IK players
Sportspeople from Turku
TuTo players
Finnish expatriate ice hockey players in France
Finnish expatriate ice hockey players in Slovakia
Finnish expatriate ice hockey players in Denmark
Finnish expatriate ice hockey players in Sweden